Christos Papadimitriou (born 10 January 1994) is a Greek professional footballer who plays as a left-back for FC Mauerwerk.

Career
On 11 July 2013, he moved to 3. Liga side RB Leipzig and signed a one-year contract. On December he was loaned to FC Liefering. In August 2014, the Saxonian Landesliga  club FC Inter Leipzig announced that they signed Papadimitriou.

References

External links
 
Onsports.gr Profile 

1994 births
Living people
Greek expatriate footballers
Association football defenders
Athinaikos F.C. players
AEK Athens F.C. players
RB Leipzig players
FC Liefering players
SV Eintracht Trier 05 players
FC Energie Cottbus players
FC Mauerwerk players
Super League Greece players
3. Liga players
Regionalliga players
2. Liga (Austria) players
Austrian Regionalliga players
Greek expatriate sportspeople in Germany
Greek expatriate sportspeople in Austria
Expatriate footballers in Germany
Expatriate footballers in Austria
Inter Leipzig players
Footballers from Athens
Greek footballers